Liam Ravenhill (born 28 November 2002) is an English professional footballer who plays as a midfielder for Blyth Spartans on loan from  club Doncaster Rovers.

Club career
After joining the Doncaster Rovers academy in 2011, Ravenhill started a two-year scholarship with the club in 2019, and was appeared for the club's first-team in pre-season friendlies ahead of the 2020–21 season. He made his professional debut on 7 November 2020 in a 5–1 FA Cup win over FC United of Manchester, and played again three days later in a 2–1 EFL Trophy defeat to Wolverhampton Wanderers U21.

Ravenhill signed a two-year professional contract with the club in June 2021. In September 2021, Ravenhill joined Mickleover on a one-month loan. He made seven appearances over the loan spell. On 22 October 2021, he joined National League North club AFC Telford United on a one-month loan, where he made three appearances. He made his league debut as a substitute in a 1–0 win over Shrewsbury Town on 11 December 2021.

In February 2022 he returned to Mickleover on loan.

On 14 October 2022, Ravenhill joined National League North club Blyth Spartans on a one-month loan deal.

International career
Ravenhill was called up to the Northern Ireland U21 squad for the first time in October 2020.

Personal life
He is the son of former professional footballer Ricky Ravenhill.

Career statistics

References

External links

2002 births
Living people
English footballers
Association football midfielders
Doncaster Rovers F.C. players
Mickleover Sports F.C. players
AFC Telford United players
Blyth Spartans A.F.C. players
English Football League players
National League (English football) players
Northern Premier League players